Laurent Grandguillaume (born 20 January 1978) is a French politician. He served as a member of the National Assembly from 2012 to 2017, representing the 1st constituency of Côte-d'Or.

References

1978 births
Living people
Politicians from Besançon
Socialist Party (France) politicians
Deputies of the 14th National Assembly of the French Fifth Republic